1070 Tunica, provisional designation , is a dark background asteroid from the outer regions of the asteroid belt, approximately 35 kilometers in diameter. It was discovered on 1 September 1926, by German astronomer Karl Reinmuth at the Heidelberg-Königstuhl State Observatory in southwest Germany. The asteroid was named after Petrorhagia, a flowering plant also known as "Tunica".

Orbit and classification 

Tunica is a non-family asteroid from the main belt's background population. Conversely, it has also been considered a core member of the Ursula family. It orbits the Sun in the outer main-belt at a distance of 3.0–3.5 AU once every 5 years and 10 months (2,123 days; semi-major axis of 3.23 AU). Its orbit has an eccentricity of 0.08 and an inclination of 17° with respect to the ecliptic.

Physical characteristics 

Tunica is an assumed C-type asteroid.

Rotation period 

In May 2017, a rotational lightcurve of Tunica was obtained from photometric observations by French amateur astronomer René Roy. Lightcurve analysis gave a rotation period of 15.8 hours with a brightness variation of 0.24 magnitude. Another lightcurve obtained in the R-band by astronomers at the Palomar Transient Factory in February 2010 gave a period of 15.673 hours and an amplitude of 0.32 magnitude.

Diameter and albedo 

According to the surveys carried out by the Japanese Akari satellite and the NEOWISE mission of NASA's Wide-field Infrared Survey Explorer, Tunica measures between 33.77 and 44.135 kilometers in diameter and its surface has an albedo between 0.0476 and 0.076.

The Collaborative Asteroid Lightcurve Link assumes a standard albedo for carbonaceous asteroids of 0.057 and calculates a diameter of 33.79 kilometers based on an absolute magnitude of 11.08.

Naming 

This minor planet was named after "Tunica" (Petrorhagia), a flowering plant derived from the common gillyflower.

Reinmuth's flowers 

Due to his many discoveries, Karl Reinmuth submitted a large list of 66 newly named asteroids in the early 1930s. This list also contained a sequence of 28 asteroids, starting with 1054 Forsytia, that were all named after plants, in particular flowering plants (also see list of minor planets named after animals and plants).

References

External links 
 Asteroid Lightcurve Database (LCDB), query form (info )
 Dictionary of Minor Planet Names, Google books
 Asteroids and comets rotation curves, CdR – Observatoire de Genève, Raoul Behrend
 Discovery Circumstances: Numbered Minor Planets (1)-(5000) – Minor Planet Center
 
 

001070
Discoveries by Karl Wilhelm Reinmuth
Named minor planets
19260901